Bajić is a Serbo-Croatian surname, a patronymic derived from the masculine nickname Baja. It may refer to:

Aleksandar Bajić (born 1987), Serbian footballer
Ana Bajić (born 1995), Serbian taekwondo practitioner
Ante Bajic (born 1995), Austrian footballer
Brana Bajic, Bosnian-born British actress
Branimir Bajić (born 1979), Bosnian footballer
Branislav Bajić (born 1977), Serbian footballer
Branko Bajić (born 1998), Bosnian footballer
Darko Bajić (born 1955), Serbian film director
Delimir Bajić (born 1983), Bosnian-Herzegovinian footballer
Đorđe Bajić (born 1975), Serbian writer, literary and film critic
Đorđe Bajić (born 1977), Serbian footballer
Đuro Bajić (born 1938), Serbian politician
Dragan Bajić (born 1973), Bosnian basketball coach and former player
Filip Bajić (born 1993), Serbian footballer
Isidor Bajić (1878-1915), Serbian composer
Jurica Bajić (born 2000), Croatian footballer
Kosta Bajić (born 1989), Serbian footballer
Luka Bajić (born 2000), Croatian water polo player
Marko Bajić (born 1985), Serbian footballer
Mane Bajić (1941–1994), Serbian footballer
Mate Bajić (born 1995), German-born Croatian footballer
Milena Bajić (born 1996), Montenegrin basketball player
Milenko Bajić (1944-2009), Bosnian-Herzegovinian and Yugoslav footballer and manager
Miloš Bajić (1915-1995), Serbian painter
Miloš Bajić (born 1994), Bosnian-Herzegovinian footballer
Mirko Bajić (born 1950), Serbian politician
Mladen Bajić (born 1950), Croatian jurist
Nedeljko Bajić Baja (born 1968), Serbian singer
Petar Bajić (born 1934), Yugoslav sports shooter
Uroš Bajić (born 1992), Serbian politician
Radoš Bajić (born 1953), Serbian actor and scenarist
Riad Bajić (born 1994), Bosnian footballer
Robert Bajic (born 1977), Australian footballer
Stefan Bajic (born 1997), Italian-born Montenegrin footballer
Stefan Bajic (born 2001), French footballer of Serbian descent
Vladimir Bajić (born 1987), Serbian footballer

Serbian surnames
Croatian surnames
Patronymic surnames
Bosnian surnames
Montenegrin surnames